Phylliscum is a genus of lichenized fungi in the family Lichinaceae. The genus contains two species.

References

External links
Phylliscum at Index Fungorum

Lichinomycetes
Lichen genera